Heavy Blue is an album by American jazz pianist Larry Willis recorded in 1989 and released on the SteepleChase label.

Track listing
All compositions by Larry Willis except where noted
 "To Wisdom, The Prize" – 8:17
 "Winther Blue" – 6:33
 "Earthlings" (Joe Ford) – 6:32
 "When I Fall in Love" (Victor Young, Edward Heyman) – 8:37
 "Nightfall" – 10:07
 "Heavy Blue" – 6:26
 "Ballad for Frederick" – 7:17
 "Habiba" (Kirk Lightsey) – 7:15

Personnel
Larry Willis – piano
Jerry González – trumpet, flugelhorn
Joe Ford – tenor saxophone
Don Pate – bass
Jeff "Tain" Watts – drums

References

1990 albums
Larry Willis albums
SteepleChase Records albums